Nagamangalam is a village in Denkanikottai taluk, Krishnagiri district, Tamil Nadu, India. As of the 2011 Census of India, Nagamangalam had a total population of 4,948	with 2,502 males and 2,446 females.

References 

Villages in Krishnagiri district